Beach soccer competitions at the 2022 South American Games in Asuncion, Paraguay were held between October 2 and 6, 2022 at the Los Pynandi World Cup Stadium.

Schedule
The competition schedule is as follows:

Medal summary

Medal table

Medalists

Participation
Five nations participated in beach soccer events of the 2022 South American Games.

References

Football
South American Games
2022